The EuroPharm Forum (European Forum of National Pharmaceutical Associations) was a network of national pharmaceutical associations in Europe, in collaboration with the World Health Organization Regional Office for Europe. It was established in 1992 as a professional forum with a strong link to the WHO.

From the beginning in 1992, the EuroPharm Forum was hosted by the WHO Regional Office for Europe. In 2006, the secretariat was relocated to Pharmakon—Danish College of Pharmacy Practice until its closure in 2015.

The Forum organised professional symposia, usually twice annually: in connection with the conduct of the General Assembly and again approximately mid-term.

See also
 List of pharmacy associations
 Pharmakon

External links
 Official website
 www.fip.org 

Pharmaceuticals policy
Pharmacy organizations
European medical and health organizations
International organizations based in Denmark
Organizations established in 1992
Organizations disestablished in 2015
1992 establishments in Europe
2015 disestablishments in Europe